Joe Terrell Wood Sr. (October 23, 1922 – April 27, 2019) was an American politician in the state of Georgia. Wood served in the United States Army during World War II. He was an alumnus of the University of Georgia and worked in the field of general insurance. He was a member of the firm Turner Wood & Smith Insurance, in Gainesville. Wood served in the Georgia House of Representatives from 1966 to 1989 and was a Democrat. He was married to Helen Thrasher. Wood died on April 27, 2019.

References

1922 births
2019 deaths
Democratic Party members of the Georgia House of Representatives
University of Georgia alumni
People from Gainesville, Georgia
Military personnel from Georgia (U.S. state)
Businesspeople from Georgia (U.S. state)
Insurance agents
United States Army personnel of World War II
20th-century American businesspeople